Krajowa Armia Podziemna (KAP, Underground Home Army) was a Polish military anticommunist organization that existed since October 1949 to January 1952. Its headquarter was located in Szybowice.

Krajowa Armia Podziemna was operating mainly in the Prudnik County, Nysa County, Wrocław Voivodeship and Olsztyn Voivodeship.

History

Origin of the organisation 
The originator of KAP was Tomasz Gołąb, member of Freedom and Independence. In October 1949, along with his wife, he visited her cousin Stanisław Stojanowski in Biała. He convinced him to create a secret military organisation, to which they could recruit migrants from Kresy Wschodnie. Its goal was a diversion on Polish People's Army during the expected World War III. Stojanowski, during his friend's wedding in Lubrza, asked Emil Stojanowski from Szybowice to join them.

Activities 
In March 1950, the organisation had 7 members. Ludwik Bartmanowicz, a poruchik after demobilization, was supposed to be its leader, but he declined the offer. Władysław Biernat planned his death in order to prevent his treason. He later ordered the murder of Jan Walasek, an officer of Ministry of Public Security in Prudnik.

In 1951 Hieronim Bednarski commanded an attack on the building of Milicja Obywatelska in a different Voivodeship in order to obtain weapons and original police IDs. On 4 May 1951 KAP attacked "Samopomoc Chłopska" in Lipowa. On 21 May 1951 they attacked and robbed Józef Chudy, a member of the Polish United Workers' Party. On 25 July 1951 they robbed Spółdzielnia Spożywców in Charbielin.

Arrest 
The first mention of an anticommunist organization in Szybowice appeared on 27 January 1950 in the notes of Józef Pleban, a worker of Ministry of Public Security in Prudnik.

Since January to March 1952 the members of Krajowa Armia Podziemna were arrested. Their hearing lasted since April 1952 to February 1953. Many of the members were sentenced. Hieronim Bednarski and Władysława Biernata were sentenced to death.

Members 
Members of the KAP were:

 Stanisław "Ogień" Stojanowski from Biała
 Emil "Kościuszko" Stojanowski from Szybowice
 Józef "Lew" Zając from Szybowice
 Jan "Motyl, Klon" Krech from Szybowice
 Władysław "Pantera" Biernat vel Bernaski from Prudnik
 Hieronim "Nawrócony" Bednarski from Szybowice
 Jan Kuszła from Szybowice
 Antoni Rzucidło "Szkop" from Szybowice
 Marian Marciniec from Prudnik
 Piotr Lipniarski from Prudnik
 Stanisław Kołodziej from Szybowice
 Tadeusz "Dąb" Nosko from Szybowice
 Władysław Zieniuk from Mieszowice
 Jan "Jawor" Mazur from Szybowice
 Piotr Dawiskiba from Szybowice
 Tadeusz "Wilk" Krupa from Ząbkowice Śląskie
 Ludwik "Olcha" Bartmanowicz from Szybowice

It's possible that Władysław Cybulka from Szybowice and Rudolf Twardysko from Prudnik also were a part of the organisation, but it was never proven. KAP was also supported by many other people, including those living in Czechoslovakia.

References

See also 
 Cursed soldiers

1949 establishments in Poland
Military units and formations disestablished in 1949
Anti-communism in Poland
Polish dissident organisations
National liberation movements
1952 disestablishments in Poland
History of Prudnik